Lecithocera ranavaloella is a moth in the family Lecithoceridae. It was described by Viette in 1967. It is found in Madagascar.

References

Moths described in 1967
ranavaloella